Mormolyca, abbreviated as Mlca in horticultural trade, is a genus of orchids comprising 26 species native to southern Mexico, Central America, the West Indies and northern South America.

Species
Species include:

 Mormolyca acutifolia (Lindl.) M.A.Blanco
 Mormolyca aureoglobula (Christenson) M.A.Blanco
 Mormolyca aurorae D.E.Benn. & Christenson
 Mormolyca calimaniana (V.P.Castro) F.Barros & L.R.S.Guim.
 Mormolyca chacoensis (Dodson) M.A.Blanco
 Mormolyca cleistogama (Brieger & Illg) M.A.Blanco
 Mormolyca culebrica Bogarín & Pupulin
 Mormolyca dressleriana (Carnevali & J.T.Atwood) M.A.Blanco
 Mormolyca fuchii J.T.Atwood
 Mormolyca gracilipes (Schltr.) Garay & Wirth
 Mormolyca hedwigiae (Hamer & Dodson) M.A.Blanco
 Mormolyca lehmanii (Rolfe) M.A.Blanco
 Mormolyca moralesii (Carnevali & J.T.Atwood) M.A.Blanco
 Mormolyca peruviana C.Schweinf.
 Mormolyca polyphylla Garay & Wirth
 Mormolyca pudica (Carnevali & J.L.Tapia) M.A.Blanco
 Mormolyca richii (Dodson) M.A.Blanco
 Mormolyca ringens (Lindl.) Gentil
 Mormolyca rufescens (Lindl.) M.A.Blanco
 Mormolyca sanantonioensis (Christenson) M.A.Blanco
 Mormolyca schlimii (Linden & Rchb.f.) M.A.Blanco
 Mormolyca schweinfurthiana Garay & Wirth
 Mormolyca sotoana (Carnevali & Gómez-Juárez) M.A.Blanco
 Mormolyca suareziorum (Dodson) M.A.Blanco
 Mormolyca tenuibulba (Christenson) M.A.Blanco
 Mormolyca vanillosma (Christenson) J.M.H.Shaw

References

External links

Maxillarieae genera
Maxillariinae
Taxa named by Eduard Fenzl